Pasteurella stomatis, is a Gram-negative, nonmotile, penicillin-sensitive coccobacillus of the family Pasteurellaceae. Bacteria from this family cause zoonotic infections in humans. These infections manifest themselves as skin or soft tissue infections after an animal bite.

See also
 Pasteurella anatis
 Pasteurella canis
 Pasteurella dagmatis
 Pasteurella langaa

References

Further reading

External links
 Animal bite infections (healthAtoZ.com)
 Bacterio entry
 Type strain of Pasteurella stomatis at BacDive -  the Bacterial Diversity Metadatabase

Bacterial diseases
Zoonoses
Pasteurellales
Bacteria described in 1985